Yakima Transit is the primary provider of mass transportation in the city of Yakima, Washington.  It was established in 1966, as Yakima City Lines, when the city of Yakima began funding the provision of transit service after the privately owned company that had been providing service went bankrupt.

Background and early years
1907, the city of Yakima's public transportation service originated with the advent of a streetcar system.  The first transit service was operated by the Yakima Valley Transportation Company (YVT).  The first motorized buses were introduced in 1924 as a supplement to the streetcar routes. The city's electric streetcar service was discontinued in 1947 when the services offered switched to an all-bus system.  A private transportation company took over operation of the bus system from YVT in 1957.  The private firm quit operation in 1966, and for four months there were no public transportation services in the city of Yakima.  The citizens of Yakima then voted to approve the state's first household tax in the fall of 1966 to financially support their public transit system.  Public transit service was re-established under contract with a private transportation management firm, and the transit system was named Yakima City Lines.  In October 1970, the City purchased the assets of the financially troubled private transportation management firm and continued transit operations ever since as a City-owned and operated public transit system.  The system was renamed Yakima Transit in December 1978.  In November 1980, Yakima citizens approved a 0.3 of 1% sales tax that replaced the City's household tax as the method of financial support for the transit system.

General
Yakima Transit provides ADA paratransit, fixed-route, vanpool, and commuter services.

Ridership varies from 1.2 million to 1.5 million bus riders per year.  Major amenities of the agency include four park & ride lots and a central terminal that can accommodate eight buses simultaneously.

All the buses are tracked using GPS.  Wireless access is also available on each bus.  Each bus has between 4-8 cameras on board for your protection, as well as live video feed.  Yakima Transit has automated ADA stop announcers on each bus.

Transit services are not available on nationally recognized holidays, but otherwise operates Mon-Sun.

Rates
Single ticket fares as of March 10, 2013: 
Adult single tickets $1.00 - monthly $25.  
Youth single tickets $0.75 - monthly $18.  
Reduced Fare single tickets $0.50 - monthly $9.  
Dial-A-Ride $2.00 one-way. (no transfers)
One-Day Passes Three times the single ticket rate up until 9:15am, then twice the single-ticket rate after 9:15am. 
Children under the age of six are not charged a fare & must be accompanied by an adult.  Children ages 6–11 should be accompanied by an adult.
Fourth of July fireworks shuttle service is offered at no cost to the rider.  Yakima Transit also provides round-trip shuttle service to the Central Washington State Fair at no cost to the rider.
Paratransit services are offered to qualifying individuals at a cost of $2.00 per one-way trip.  This service is provided by Medstar LLC. 
Commuter bus services are operated between the Yakima Airport and Central Washington University in Ellensburg, WA at a rate of $150 for a monthly pass or $5 for a one-way ticket.

Transfers
Transfers are free for unlimited rides on any fixed-route bus, on any route, during one of three time periods each day.  Morning transfer tickets are valid until 9:15am.  Mid-day transfer tickets are honored from 8:45am to 3:15pm and afternoon/evening transfers are effective from 2:45pm until the close of service.  The boarding time determines which transfer they receive.

Fixed-Route Service
The fixed-route bus service is offered during the weekdays and on a limited schedule on Saturdays 8:45-6:00pm and Sundays 8:00am – 4:00pm.  Sunday bus service is a permanent service that is limited to six routes running on the hour for an eight-hour period.

Route 1  Summitview/Lincoln

Routes 2 & 5 Tieton/Nob Hill

Routes 3 & 4 Mead/Fruitvale

Route 6 Fair Ave/North 1st

Route 7 & 9 South 1st/40th/Washington

Route 10 N. 1st Street (Yakima) & Selah (1st Street to Firing Center P&R)

Route 11 Yakima-Ellensburg Commuter (Yakima Airport to Central Washington University)

The buses shown along the same streets provide service in the opposite direction of the other bus.

Vanpool
Vanpool services are offered to riders/commuters who travel out of the Yakima area more than 20 miles from City limits.  Vanpool service is a cost recovery program meaning Yakima Transit pays the fuel, insurance, and maintenance costs in exchange for a monthly rider fee.  Annual ridership is roughly 65,000 - 75,000 passenger trips per year.

Dial-A-Ride (paratransit)
Dial-A-Ride services are only available during the same times that fixed-route services are available.  Yakima Transit contracts with Medstar, LLC, to provide Dial-A-Ride services.  Dial-a-Ride is only available to individuals who cannot ride the bus system for one reason or another or their transit stop is not accessible.  Service is only available to individuals who start the service within the Cities of Yakima or Selah.

Applications to use the service must be approved in advance.  Annual ridership varies between 65,000 and 75,000 riders per year.

Yakima-Ellensburg Commuter
Yakima Transit provides commuter bus service between the Yakima Airport in Yakima, Washington, and Central Washington University in Ellensburg, Washington.  The service costs $5 per one-way trip or $150 for an unlimited monthly pass.  Central Washington Airporter operates the service under a contract with Yakima Transit.  There are several partners that make the Commuter service feasible.  These partners include: Yakima Transit, the Washington State Department of Transportation, City of Selah, and Central Washington University.  Annual ridership is typically between 30,000-45,000 passengers per year.

The Commuter monthly pass is good for a free ride on Yakima Transit's services any time or day of the week that the fixed-route bus service operates. Similarly, Commuter cash or ticket passengers can obtain one free transfer on a Yakima Transit route for the day that they rode the Commuter.

Fleet
Yakima Transit operates 28 buses, 28 demand response (ADA) vehicles, 28 vanpool vehicles, 0 commuter vehicles. Fixed-route fleet primarily consists of Gillig buses.
Demand response fleet consists of cut-away vans and mini-vans.
Vanpool fleet consists of 7, 12, and 15 passenger vans.

See also 
 Yakima Electric Railway Museum
 Yakima Valley Transportation Company

References

External links

 Yakima Transit Website
 2015 Summer Bus Book
 Transit Development Plan 2014, 2015-2020

Bus transportation in Washington (state)
Yakima, Washington
Transportation in Yakima County, Washington
1966 establishments in Washington (state)